Trent Baron Bryant (born August 14, 1959) is a former American football cornerback in the National Football League (NFL), the Canadian Football League (CFL) and the United States Football League (USFL). He played for the Washington Redskins and the Kansas City Chiefs in the NFL, the Chicago Blitz, the Arizona Outlaws and the Los Angeles Express in the USFL, and the Saskatchewan Roughriders in the CFL. He played college football at the University of Arkansas.

External links
 NFL.com player page
 USFL players in the NFL

1959 births
Living people
People from Arkadelphia, Arkansas
Players of American football from Arkansas
American football cornerbacks
Arkansas Razorbacks football players
Washington Redskins players
Kansas City Chiefs players
National Football League replacement players
Chicago Blitz players
Arizona Outlaws players
Los Angeles Express players
American players of Canadian football
Canadian football defensive backs
Saskatchewan Roughriders players